Alloplitis is a genus of braconid wasps in the family Braconidae. There are about eight described species in Alloplitis. Alloplitis congensis is found in west Africa, and the other species in Indomalaya.

Species
These eight species belong to the genus Alloplitis:
 Alloplitis albiventris Long & van Achterberg, 2008
 Alloplitis completus Mason, 1981
 Alloplitis congensis (de Saeger, 1944)
 Alloplitis detractus (Walker, 1860)
 Alloplitis guapo Nixon, 1965
 Alloplitis laevigaster Long & van Achterberg, 2008
 Alloplitis typhon Nixon, 1965
 Alloplitis vietnamicus Long & van Achterberg, 2008

References

Microgastrinae